Jack I. Abecassis is an American scholar of French literature. He is the Edwin Sexton and Edna Patrick Smith Modern European Languages Professor and Professor of Romance Languages and Literatures at Pomona College in Claremont, California.

References

External links
Faculty page at Pomona College

Year of birth missing (living people)
Living people
Pomona College faculty
American literary historians
Scholars of French literature
Historians from California